Liran Shriki (born April 4, 1994 in Netanya) is a former Israeli footballer.

References

External links
 

1994 births
Israeli Jews
Living people
Israeli footballers
Maccabi Netanya F.C. players
Hapoel Nir Ramat HaSharon F.C. players
Hapoel Beit She'an F.C. players
Hapoel Ironi Baqa al-Gharbiyye F.C. players
Ironi Tiberias F.C. players
Hapoel Asi Gilboa F.C. players
Hapoel Bnei Ar'ara 'Ara F.C. players
Israeli Premier League players
Liga Leumit players
Footballers from Netanya
Israeli people of Moroccan-Jewish descent
Association football midfielders